East Pyongyang Stadium(동평양경기장) is a multi-purpose stadium in Pyongyang, North Korea.  It is currently used mostly for football matches.  The stadium holds 30,000 spectators and opened in 1960.

See also 
 List of football stadiums in North Korea

References

Football venues in North Korea
Sports venues in North Korea
Multi-purpose stadiums in North Korea
Sports venues completed in 1960
Sports venues in Pyongyang
1960 establishments in North Korea